Mohammad Naeem may refer to one of the following people:

Sport
 Mohammad Naeem (cricketer, born 1959), Pakistani cricketer for Income Tax Department and Lahore City
 Mohammad Naeem (cricketer, born 1986), Pakistani cricketer for Abbottabad and the Abbottabad Rhinos
 Mohammad Naeem (cricketer, born 1990), Pakistani cricketer for Abbottabad, the Abbottabad Falcons, the Abbottabad Rhinos, and Khyber Pakhtunkhwa
 Mohammad Naeem (Lahore cricketer), Pakistani cricketer for Lahore and Lahore A

 Other fields
 Muhammad Naeem (Islamic scholar), born 1955
 Muhammad Naeem (physicist), Pakistani nuclear physicist

See also
Muhammad Naeem Noor Khan (born 1979), an alleged al-Qaeda operative